The 33rd PMPC Star Awards for Movies, was organized by the Philippine Movie Press Club (PMPC) and recognizes the best films and filmmakers for the past year. The awards night was held on September 3, 2017 at the Newport Performing Arts Theater, Resorts World Manila, Pasay and aired on ABS-CBN.

The awards night was hosted by Aljur Abrenica, Yassi Pressman, Daniel Matsunaga, Alex Gonzaga, and Robi Domingo with opening numbers performed by Christian Bautista featuring Isay Alvarez, Sam Concepcion, Edgar Allan Guzman featuring Darren Espanto. While the dance number was performed by Ciara Sotto, Jon Lucas, Maris Racal, Sofia Andres, Grae Fernandez and Zeus Collins.

Die Beautiful won big, bagged five awards, including Best Director, Best Picture, Best Cinematographer, Best Editor, and Best Screenwriter. Another highlight of the night was when screen legends Vilma Santos and Nora Aunor shared the top honor of Best Actress and young actor Daniel Padilla hailed as Best Actor.

Winners and Nominees
These are the nominations list (in alphabetical order) for the awarding ceremony. (period of nomination: Films that have been shown from January to December 2016). Winners are listed first and highlighted with boldface.

Major categories

Technical categories

Special awards

 Nora Aunor Ulirang Artista Lifetime Achievement Award - Pen Medina
 Ulirang Alagad ng Pelikula sa Likod ng Kamera Lifetime Achievement Award - Joel Lamangan

Rundown
Note: Except special awards.

Mainstream

Indie

See also
List of Philippine films of 2016

References

PMPC
PMPC
Philippine film awards